Gino Bartolucci (24 May 1905 – 26 February 1998) was an Italian racing cyclist. He rode in the 1926 Tour de France.

References

1905 births
1998 deaths
Italian male cyclists
Place of birth missing